Jacobi's four-square theorem gives a formula for the number of ways that a given positive integer n can be represented as the sum of four squares.

History
The theorem was proved in 1834 by Carl Gustav Jakob Jacobi.

Theorem
Two representations are considered different if their terms are in different order or if the integer being squared (not just the square) is different; to illustrate, these are three of the eight different ways to represent 1:

The number of ways to represent n as the sum of four squares is eight times the sum of the divisors of n if n is odd and 24 times the sum of the odd divisors of n if n is even (see divisor function), i.e.

 

Equivalently, it is eight times the sum of all its divisors which are not divisible by 4, i.e.

We may also write this as

where the second term is to be taken as zero if n is not divisible by 4. In particular, for a prime number p we have the explicit formula r4(p) = 8(p + 1).

Some values of r4(n) occur infinitely often as r4(n) = r4(2mn) whenever n is even. The values of r4(n) can be arbitrarily large: indeed, r4(n) is infinitely often larger than 8.

Proof
The theorem can be proved by elementary means starting with the Jacobi triple product.

The proof shows that the Theta series for the lattice Z4 is a modular form of a certain level, and hence equals a linear combination of Eisenstein series.

See also 
Lagrange's four-square theorem
Lambert series
Sum of squares function

Notes

References

External links 

Squares in number theory
Theorems in number theory